Modern Rock is the second studio album by New Zealand group The Clean, released in 1994.

Critical reception
Trouser Press called the album "a more grown-up affair that floats off-kilter melodies and tiny tensile guitar in a slower, softer swirl of cloudy organ lines and spacey electric piano textures, with liberal use of strings and folk instruments."

Track listing

Personnel
The Clean
David Kilgour – sang and played guitars, keyboards, percussion, and hammer dulcimer.
Robert Scott – sang and played bass, acoustic guitar, keyboards, percussion, and hammer dulcimer.
Hamish Kilgour – sang and played drums, percussion, and guitar.

Additional musicians
Alan Starrett – played hammer dulcimer, cello, viola, mandolin, and accordion.
Lisa Siegel – played percussion on "Do Your Thing."
Brydie Scott – sang "Ginger Ale."
Stephen Kilroy – foot stomped on "Something I Need."

Charts

References

External links
 

1994 albums
The Clean albums
Flying Nun Records albums